Positively Naked is a 2006 documentary film for Cinemax about people living with HIV/AIDS.

References

2006 films
Cinemax original films
Documentary films about HIV/AIDS
HIV/AIDS in American films
American documentary films
American LGBT-related films
2006 LGBT-related films
2000s American films